2015 J.League U-22 Selection season.

J3 League

References

External links
 J.League official site

J.League U-22 Selection
J.League U-22 Selection seasons